Generations For Peace (GFP) is a Jordanian non-governmental organisation based in Amman dedicated to peacebuilding through sustainable conflict transformation at the grassroots. Founded in 2007 by Prince Feisal Al Hussein, GFP has worked with and empowered volunteer leaders of youth in 51 countries around the world to promote active tolerance and responsible citizenship in communities experiencing various forms of conflict and violence. As a peace-through-sports organisations officially recognised by the International Olympic Committee, it uses sport-based games, art, advocacy, dialogue, and empowerment activities to serve as an entry point for engaging children, youth, and adults, and to promote integrated education and sustained behavioural change.

History 

Generations For Peace was founded as a peace-through-sports initiative of the Jordan Olympic Committee in 2007, but has since expanded to include art, advocacy, dialogue, and empowerment as tools to bring peace to communities facing division and conflict. It has also been supported by a variety of partners, including the European Union, UNICEF, USAID, UNESCO, International Olympic Committee, Samsung, and the University of Oxford.

Generations For Peace established a research institute, the Generations For Peace Institute, in 2010.

Model 
Generations For Peace uses a volunteer cascading model in which trained volunteers in turn train future volunteers in their home communities, ensuring that programmes and ideas are spread while remaining true to their original design.

Generations For Peace has trained youth volunteers in regions affected by conflict across 50 countries around the globe.

Locations

Satellite Offices 

 Sarajevo, Bosnia and Herzegovina
 Kaduna, Nigeria
 Garoowe and Mogadishu, Somalia
 Juba, South Sudan
 Khartoum, Sudan

Countries with  GFP Programmes 
All countries with currently active GFP Programmes as of 2020 are highlighted in bold.

Research Partners 

 Uppsala University
 Georgetown University
 University of the Western Cape
 Institute for the Study of Conflict Transformation
 University of Oxford

References 

Non-profit organisations based in Jordan
Organizations established in 2007